The Cabinet of François-Pierre Guizot was the last ministry of King Louis Philippe I of France, formed by decree of 19 September 1847.
It replaced the Third cabinet of Nicolas Jean-de-Dieu Soult.
It was dissolved when the Provisional Government was formed on 24 February 1848 after the February Revolution.

Ministers
The ministers were:
President of the Council and Minister of Foreign Affairs: François Guizot
Interior: Tanneguy Duchâtel
Sub-secretary of State for the Interior : Antoine François Passy
Justice and Religious Affairs: Michel Hébert
War: Camille Alphonse Trézel
Sub-secretary of State for War: Pierre Magne (as of 24 November 1847)
Finance: Pierre Sylvain Dumon
Navy and Colonies: Louis Napoléon Lannes, Duke of Montebello
Sub-secretary of State, Navy and Colonies: Jean Jubelin
Public Education: Narcisse-Achille de Salvandy
Public Works: Hippolyte Paul Jayr
Agriculture and Commerce: Laurent Cunin-Gridaine

References

Sources

French governments
1847 establishments in France
1848 disestablishments in France
Cabinets established in 1847
Cabinets disestablished in 1848